Poirieria zelandica, common name the spiny murex, is a species of large predatory sea snail with an operculum. It is a marine gastropod mollusc in the family Muricidae, the rock snails or murex snails.

Description
These shells are roughly fusiforms, with long, straight spines. The aperture is ovate and large. The outer lip is thin.

Distribution
This species can be found in Tasmania and New Zealand.

Gallery

References

 Powell A W B, New Zealand Mollusca, William Collins Publishers Ltd, Auckland, New Zealand 1979 
 Glen Pownall, New Zealand Shells and Shellfish, Seven Seas Publishing Pty Ltd, Wellington, New Zealand 1979 

Gastropods of New Zealand
Poirieria
Gastropods described in 1833